Andrius Kubilius (born 8 December 1956) is a Lithuanian politician who has been serving as a Member of the European Parliament (MEP) since 2019. He served as Prime Minister of Lithuania from 1999 to 2000 and again from 2008 to 2012. He was leader of the conservative political party Homeland Union.

Early life and education
Kubilius was born in Vilnius. After graduation from the 22nd secondary school in Vilnius, Kubilius was accepted to Vilnius University and studied in the Faculty of Physics until 1979. He continued his academic career and postgraduate studies at Vilnius University from 1981 to 1984.

Political career

Career in national politics
Kubilius became a member of the pro-independence Sąjūdis movement, who favoured separation from the Soviet Union. He later became the Executive Secretary of the Sąjūdis Council. Soon after the re-establishment of Lithuania's independence, Kubilius was elected to the Seimas (parliament). Since then Kubilius has been an active figure in Lithuanian politics. He became a member of the Homeland Union – Lithuanian Christian Democrats in 1993.

Between 1996 and 1999 Kubilius served as Deputy Speaker of Seimas. After Rolandas Paksas resignation as the Prime Minister of Lithuania, Andrius Kubilius became new Prime Minister. He served up until 2000 parliamentary election.

Kubilius led the Homeland Union – Lithuanian Christian Democrats Party into elections on 28 October 2008. Conservatives defeated the Social Democrats, making Kubilius the main candidate for Prime Minister. On 27 November 2008 Kubilius was officially appointed as Prime Minister of Lithuania. He received 89 votes in favour, 27 against, and 16 members of the Seimas abstained. In 2012 Kubilius became the first prime minister of Lithuania to serve his entire term. His government made a lot of unpopular austerity decisions to counter recession. Despite the unpopularity of austerity, Lithuania made one of strongest economic recoveries in Europe. Kubilius is considered by some being the best Prime Minister of Lithuania modern history.

Member of the European Parliament, 2019–present
Kubilius has been a Member of the European Parliament since the 2019 elections. He joined European People's Party Group. In parliament, he has since been serving on the Committee on Foreign Affairs and the Committee on Industry, Research and Energy. In this capacity, he is the parliament's rapporteur on relations with Russia. Kubilius said it is "impossible" to have good relations with Russia and called for the EU to phase out its imports of oil and natural gas from Russia. He praised  Turkey for "proving thrice [in Syria, Libya and Nagorno-Karabakh] that the Kremlin fears the fist."

In addition to his committee assignments, Kubilius is part of the parliament's delegations to the Euronest Parliamentary Assembly and to the EU-Ukraine Parliamentary Association Committee. He is also a member of the Spinelli Group.

In November 2021, Kubilius joined a group of seven Members of the European Parliament led by Raphaël Glucksmann to Taiwan to send a strong signal in support of the self-ruling island, despite a threat of retaliation from China.

Personal life
Kubilius is married to Rasa Kubilienė, a violinist in the Lithuanian National Symphony Orchestra; the couple have two sons and three grandchildren.  Kubilius speaks Lithuanian, Russian and English.

References

External links

Andrius Kubilius in the official website of Seimas

|-

1956 births
Living people
21st-century Lithuanian politicians
Members of the Seimas
Prime Ministers of Lithuania
Homeland Union politicians
Recipients of the Order of the Cross of Terra Mariana, 3rd Class
Recipients of the Order of Prince Yaroslav the Wise, 2nd class
Vilnius University alumni
Politicians from Vilnius
MEPs for Lithuania 2019–2024